The 2007-08 curling season began in September 2007 and ended in April 2008.

Season of Champions top three finishes
(Only team's skip listed)

Other events

World Curling Tour winners

Women's World Curling Tour winners

Events in bold indicate Grand Slam events.

WCT Money Ranking

Sources

Seasons in curling